Hits and Misses is a Nancy Drew and Hardy Boys Supermystery crossover novel, published in 1993.

Plot summary
Bess Marvin, friend of Nancy Drew, gets a spot on a national TV talent show, and Nancy is, at first, excited. She then finds an amnesiac who pleads with her to help her, and she agrees, trying to piece together the life she had. Meanwhile, the Hardys try to figure the case of Angelique, a recording star whose account has been the victim of embezzlement. Finding a key link to both cases, the boys and Nancy try to work it out, meeting face-to-face with a murderer.

References

External links
Supermystery series books

Supermystery
1993 American novels
1993 children's books
Novels about music
Nancy Drew books
The Hardy Boys books